The Liechtensteiner Footballer of the Year is an award granted every season to a Liechtensteiner footballer. It is awarded by the country's Liechtensteiner Vaterland newspaper, and was first awarded in 1981. In 2008, Gaspar Odirlei became the first non-Liechtensteiner to win the award. In 2022, there was a Women's footballer of the year award for the first time.

Winners (Men)

Winners (Women)

Club Winners (Men)

References

External links
 Official site

Association football player of the year awards by nationality
Football in Liechtenstein
Awards established in 1981
1981 establishments in Liechtenstein
Liechtenstein awards
Annual events in Liechtenstein